Ronald Arthur Colin Martyn (27 January 1903 – 11 January 1968) was an Australian rules footballer who played in the Victorian Football League (VFL).

Martyn made his debut for the Carlton Football Club in round 3 of the 1928 season. He left the game at the end of the 1932 season.

External links

Colin Martyn at Blueseum

Carlton Football Club players
Coburg Football Club players
Australian rules footballers from Melbourne
1903 births
1968 deaths
People from Brunswick, Victoria